Dragan Bočeski (born 24 November 1963) is a Macedonian football coach and former player who coached FK Pelister. He played as a midfielder.

Playing career
As a player, Bočeski played with FK Željezničar Sarajevo and FK Vardar in the Yugoslav First League, and with FK Spartak Subotica and FK Pelister in Yugoslav Second League.

Managerial career
Bočeski later managed Macedonia U19, FK Napredok and FK Pelister.

References

1963 births
Living people
Sportspeople from Ohrid
Association football midfielders
Macedonian footballers
Yugoslav footballers
FK Željezničar Sarajevo players
FK Spartak Subotica players
FK Pelister players
FK Vardar players
PAS Giannina F.C. players
Yugoslav First League players
Macedonian football managers
FK Osogovo managers
FK Napredok managers
FK Horizont Turnovo managers
FK Pelister managers
FK Ohrid managers
Macedonian expatriate footballers
Yugoslav expatriate footballers
Macedonian expatriate sportspeople in Greece
Expatriate footballers in Greece